{{Infobox gridiron football person
| name = 
| image = 
| alt = 
| caption = Pellegrini featured on the cover of a 1955 Sports Illustrated'
| birth_date = 
| birth_place = Yatesboro, Pennsylvania, U.S.
| death_date = 
| death_place = Marmora, New Jersey, U.S.
| team = 
| number = 53
| status = 
| position1 = Center, linebacker
| height_ft = 6
| height_in = 2
| weight_lb = 233
| college = Maryland
| NFLDraftedYear = 1956
| NFLDraftedRound = 1
| NFLDraftedPick = 4
| NFLDraftedTeam = Philadelphia Eagles
| playing_years1 = 1956–1961
| playing_team1 = Philadelphia Eagles
| playing_years2 = 1962–1965
| playing_team2 = Washington Redskins
| career_highlights = 
 ACC Player of the Year (1955)
| NFL = PEL415288
| DatabaseFootball = PELLEBOB01
| CollegeHOF = 1818
}}
Robert Francis Pellegrini (November 13, 1934 – April 11, 2008) was an American football linebacker in the National Football League for the Philadelphia Eagles and the Washington Redskins.  He played college football at Maryland, where he was an All-American as a center.  Pellegrini was drafted in the first round (fourth overall) of the 1956 NFL Draft.  In 1996, he was inducted into the College Football Hall of Fame.

In 1955, he finished sixth in number of votes for the Heisman Trophy. He was featured on the cover of the November 7, 1955 edition of Sports Illustrated'' magazine.  He was a member of the Gamma Chi Chapter of the Sigma Chi Fraternity at the University of Maryland.  All American football players Chet "the Jet" Hanulak and Bill Walker were fellow Sigma Chi Fraternity brothers of Pellegrini at Maryland.

After his professional playing career with the Philadelphia Eagles and Washington Redskins, he joined the Miami Dolphins staff as the linebackers coach from 1966 to 1967.

Pellegrini died at the age of 73 on April 11, 2008, at his home in the Marmora section of Upper Township, New Jersey.

References

External links

1934 births
2008 deaths
All-American college football players
American football linebackers
Players of American football from Pennsylvania
Philadelphia Eagles players
Washington Redskins players
Maryland Terrapins football players
College Football Hall of Fame inductees
People from Armstrong County, Pennsylvania
People from Upper Township, New Jersey
Miami Dolphins coaches